Police Station No. 2 is a registered historic building in downtown Cincinnati, Ohio, listed in the National Register on May 18, 1981.

Police Station No. 2 is a contributing property to the Lytle Park Historic District.

Notes

External links
Documentation from the University of Cincinnati

National Register of Historic Places in Cincinnati
Buildings and structures in Cincinnati
Government buildings on the National Register of Historic Places in Ohio
Police stations on the National Register of Historic Places